Ali Nasir Muhammad Al-Husani (born 31 December 1939, in Mudiyah, Mutawakkilite Kingdom of Yemen) is the former leader of South Yemen serving as General Secretary of the Yemeni Socialist Party between 1980 and 1986. He was twice president of South Yemen and once the Prime Minister. He served as the Prime Minister from 2 August 1971 until 14 February 1985 and as Chairman of the Presidential Council from 26 June 1978, after overthrowing and executing Salim Rubai Ali, until 27 December 1978.

In April 1980, South Yemeni president Abdul Fattah Ismail resigned and moved to Moscow. His successor was Ali Nasir Muhammad who took a less interventionist stance toward both North Yemen and neighbouring Oman. On January 13, 1986, a violent struggle began in Aden between Ali Nasir's supporters and supporters of the returned Ismail, the South Yemen Civil War. Fighting lasted for more than a month and resulted in thousands of casualties, Ali Nasir's ouster, and Ismail's death. Muhammad's term had lasted from 21 April 1980 to 24 January 1986. Some 60,000 people, including the deposed Ali Nasir, fled to North Yemen. He was succeeded by Haidar Abu Bakr al-Attas.

Mohammed was a member of the National Front, ar. الجبهة القومية (NF) as well as the Yemeni Socialist Party (YSP - الحزب الاشتراكي اليمني) after the YSP was formed from  the UPONF in October 1978. During the 1994 Civil War in Yemen, he pushed his supporters to operate alongside the forces of Sana'a government and against the recently re-established Democratic Republic of Yemen, seeking revenge for his ouster. The southern secession was repressed in July 1994 after the surrender of Aden and Mukalla strongholds.

The former president became an opposition figure in the 2011 Yemeni uprising, being named to a 17-member transitional council intended by some anti-government factions to govern Yemen during a prospective transition from the authoritarian regime led by President Ali Abdullah Saleh to a plural democracy. This council was opposed by the Joint Meeting Parties, the main opposition coalition, which also supported Saleh's removal from power and a transition to democracy.

In February 2015, there were media reports that Muhammad was being considered as a prospective interim leader of a "presidential council" after the collapse of the government.

See also
 "Russian Translation" (2006) – Russian TV political detective serial: the first four scenes are giving the fictionalised version of Aden 1986 civil war between Ali Nasir Muhammad and the opposition in YSP.

References

|-

|-

|-

1939 births
Chairmen of the Presidium of the Supreme People's Council
Communism in Yemen
Living people
Presidents of South Yemen
Yemeni Socialist Party politicians
Yemeni socialists